Washington is an abandoned "L" station on the CTA's Red Line. It was a subway station in the State Street subway located at 128 North State Street in the Loop. It is the only closed station on the Red Line.

History

Structure

The platform at Washington is part of a long continuous platform beneath State Street which runs from the Jackson station to the Lake station, spanning nearly seven blocks, making it the United States' longest continuous passenger platform.  There are two mezzanines with turnstiles for the station: a northern at Randolph shared with the Lake station and a southern at Madison.  There are stairs and escalators along State Street between Randolph and Madison to access both mezzanines.  Additionally, Washington is equipped with an elevator to the northern (Randolph) mezzanine and was therefore accessible to people with disabilities. There is another elevator between that mezzanine and State Street, which is still in use for access to the Lake station.

There were two stairways on the platform to a lower level pedestrian tunnel that connected the Washington station to its counterpart on the Blue Line subway, Washington/Dearborn, to allow transfers between the Red and Blue Lines. Lake station to the north of Washington and Washington were originally a single station, but they were separated on June 2, 1996 due to the renovation project of the Randolph-Washington mezzanine and Lake became an independent station on November 18, 1997 in order to better facilitate transfers between the Red Line subway and the elevated State/Lake station.

Closure for superstation
As part of the development of 108 North State Street (commonly known as "Block 37") the CTA planned to construct a superstation located between the Red and Blue Lines (which run in parallel subways through the Loop). Washington station, and the lower level transfer tunnel to the Blue Line closed at midnight on October 23, 2006 for work related to the construction of this new station. The platform was cut at an angle to facilitate a future track connection from the northbound State Street track to the super station and the northbound Blue Line track north of Washington, linking O'Hare and Midway airports via the Blue, Red, and Orange lines' tracks. A similar excavation was made north of the Blue Line's Washington station to allow a future connection for southbound Blue Line trains to travel east to the super station and the southbound Red Line track.

Following cost overruns of $100 million the superstation was indefinitely mothballed in June 2008. The Block 37 superstation, which had already been excavated and partially built, was left abandoned. The hole that had been excavated in Washington's platform was filled in. The transfer tunnel and Washington-Madison mezzanine were both sealed off and the station's platform reopened in February 2010. However the station remained closed and trains never resumed stopping at the station.

Post closure

When the CTA closed the Washington station, most of it was left intact. Originally, no work was performed to decommission the Washington-Madison mezzanine, so that if a reopening was considered, it would be fairly low-budget and modest project. The platform changed little, except for the removal of its signage. However, the signs that say "Escalator: Washington-Madison" and "To Madison or Monroe St" were not removed for unknown reasons. Until February 2015, the "Washington: To Howard" and "Washington: To 95/Dan Ryan" signs also remained on the walls of the southern half of the Lake station. The Washington station signs on the walls remained until 2009 when the CTA removed the station signs from the walls to indicate it was no longer a station and Washington/State was removed from CTA rail maps in January 2009. When the permanent closure of Washington became more "certain," the turnstiles and fare vending machines were removed from the Washington-Madison mezzanine. , power has been cut to the Washington-Madison mezzanine.

Due to its location, the Washington station is still easily accessible for pedestrian access via the Lake and Monroe stations.

References

External links

 Washington/State Station Page at  Chicago-L.org

CTA Red Line stations
Railway stations in the United States opened in 1943
Railway stations closed in 2006
1943 establishments in Illinois
2006 disestablishments in Illinois
Defunct Chicago "L" stations